Hans H. Zingg is a Professor Emeritus in the Department of Pharmacology and Therapeutics and Wyeth-Ayerst Chair in Women’s Health at McGill University in Montreal, Quebec, Canada.

Biography 
He earned his Doctor of Medicine (M.D.) from the University of Basel in Switzerland, followed by a Doctor of Philosophy (Ph.D.) in Experimental Medicine from McGill University. He then completed post-doctoral training at Harvard Medical School.

He joined McGill University in 1984 and eventually rose to the rank of Full Professor in the Departments of Medicine, Pharmacology and Therapeutics, as well as Obstetrics and Gynecology.

Before becoming the chair of the Department of Pharmacology and Therapeutics from 2002 to 2011, he acted as Director of the Laboratory of Molecular Endocrinology at the old Royal Victoria Hospital and Associate Director for Fundamental Research at the MUHC Research Institute.

Research 
His research mostly addressed the molecular mechanisms of oxytocin. Amongst other things, he showed that the oxytocin, a pituitary hormone, was also produced in the uterus and contributed to labor and childbirth.

Honours 
He received the Distinguished Scientist Award from the Canadian Society for Clinical Investigations, as well as Senior Scientist Award from the CIHR.

References 

Living people
Year of birth missing (living people)
McGill University alumni
Academic staff of McGill University